Georges Pintens (born 15 October 1946 in Antwerp) is a former professional road bicycle racer from Belgium who excelled at one-day classic races during the 1960s and 1970s.

Pintens most successful year was in 1971 when he captured the Belgian classic, Gent–Wevelgem, and the overall title at the Tour de Suisse but finished second to Eddy Merckx at Liège–Bastogne–Liège.

In 1974, Pintens returned to win Liège–Bastogne–Liège.

Major results

1969 – Mann-Grundig
 1st, Rund um den Henninger Turm
1970 – Mann-Grundig
 1st, Amstel Gold Race
1971 – Hertekamp-Magniflex
 1st, Gent–Wevelgem
 1st overall, Tour de Suisse
 2nd, Liège–Bastogne–Liège
1972 – Van Cauter-Magniflex-de Gribaldy
 1st, GP Kanton Aargau
1973 – Rokado
 1st, Rund um den Henninger Turm
 1st, Ruta del Sol
 1st, Prologue, Tour of Belgium
1974 – MIC-Ludo-de Gribaldy
 1st, Liège–Bastogne–Liège
1975 – Maes-Watney
1976 – Miko-de Gribaldy-Superia
 1st, Stage, Vuelta a España

Tour de France record 
 1968 – 12th overall and 1st, Stage 12 (Pau > Saint-Gaudens)
 1970 – 10th overall

External links 

Official Tour de France results for Georges Pintens

1946 births
Living people
Belgian male cyclists
Belgian Tour de France stage winners
Cyclists from Antwerp
Belgian Vuelta a España stage winners
Tour de Suisse stage winners